Bernie is a 1996 French film directed by Albert Dupontel.

Plot
It tells the story of Bernie Noël, a 29-year-old man who's been raised all his life in an orphanage in Paris' suburbs. He was found in a garbage can when he was only a few months old. His first name comes from the man who found him there (Bernie, the building's janitor) and his last name comes from the time of year when he was found (Noël, "Christmas" in French).

At age 29, Bernie decides to leave the orphanage to explore a world that he knows only through television and what his friends have told him. On his own, roaming a Paris-by-night hostile environment, he goes through several madly epic adventures searching for his parents, before eventually finding them and "saving" them from an imaginary government conspiracy.

This neurotic and maladjusted young man will bring mischief and mayhem in his trail, which will lead him and his loved ones to a dramatic conclusion...

Film info
 Directed by : Albert Dupontel
 Story : Albert Dupontel and Gilles Laurent
 Dialogues : Albert Dupontel
 Production : Canal+, Contre Prod, Kasso Inc. Productions, Rézo Films, Ulysse Films
 Category: Comedy (?)
 Running time: 87 min
 Country: France
 Sound: Dolby Digital
 Language: French
 Release :
 November 27, 1996 (France)
 January 8, 1997 ( Belgium)
 Rated: PG13

Cast

 Albert Dupontel: Bernie Noël
 Roland Blanche: Donald Willis, Bernie's father
 Lucia Sanchez: Maria
 Paul Le Person: Bernie, the janitor
 Hélène Vincent: Bernie's mother
 Claude Perron: Marion
 Roland Bertin: Ramonda
 Catherine Samie: Granny
 Alain Libolt: Dr. Clermont
 Pascal Ternisien: Edouard Clermont
 Emmanuelle Bougerol: Marie-Solange Clermont
 Philippe Uchan: Vallois
 Nicolas Marié: The Commissioner
 Éric Elmosnino: the salesman
 Antoinette Moya: the real-estate agent
 Michel Vuillermoz: the transvestite
 Loïc Houdré: the dealer
 Yves Pignot: the orphanage's manager

Nominations
The film was nominated for the César Award for Best First Feature Film at the 22nd César Awards.

References

External links
 

1996 films
French drama films
Films directed by Albert Dupontel
1996 drama films
1996 directorial debut films
1990s French films